The Edel Be All is a South Korean single-place, paraglider that was designed and produced by Edel Paragliders of Gwangju. It is now out of production.

Design and development
The Be All was designed as a beginner's glider and introduced in 2003. The models are each named for their relative size.

Variants
Be All S
Small-sized model for lighter pilots. The glider model is DHV 1 certified.
Be All M
Mid-sized model for medium-weight pilots. The glider model is DHV 1 certified.
Be All L
Large-sized model for heavier pilots. The glider model is DHV 1 certified.

Specifications (Be All L)

References

Be All
Paragliders